The 2010 United States Senate election in Vermont took place on November 2, 2010 alongside other elections to the United States Senate in other states as well as elections to the United States House of Representatives and various state and local elections. Incumbent Democratic U.S. Senator Patrick Leahy was re-elected to a seventh term.

Democratic primary

Candidates 
 Patrick Leahy, incumbent U.S. Senator
 Daniel Freilich, military doctor (also running as an independent)

Results

General election

Candidates 
 Len Britton (R), businessman
 Patrick Leahy (D), incumbent U.S. Senator
 Stephen Cain (I)
 Pete Diamondstone (Socialist)
 Cris Ericson (U.S. Marijuana), two-time former candidate for U.S. Senate
 Daniel Freilich (I), military doctor
 Johenry Nunes (I), military education and training manager

Campaign 
First elected in 1974, Leahy is the first and only Democrat elected to the U.S. Senate from Vermont. He won his last two re-election campaigns with at least 70% of the vote. He is the second-most-senior member of Congress. In a June 2010 poll, the incumbent was viewed very favorably by 52% of the state. 52% of the state opposed repeal of the Affordable Care Act (ACA) and 50% opposed Arizona's immigration law. Obama's approval rating in the poll was 62%. Obama carried Vermont with 67% of the vote in 2008.

His Republican opponent was Len Britton, a businessman who had never run for public office before. As of August 2010, he had released two TV ads, criticizing Obama's stimulus and the deficits. His campaign manager admitted "Len is an unknown candidate and we are rigorously running on a difficult campaign schedule."

Debates 
 October 14: All four candidates on CCTV in Burlington
 October 19: Two candidates on Vermont Public Radio

Predictions

Polling

Fundraising

Results

References

External links 
 Elections and Campaign Finance Division at the Vermont Secretary of State
 U.S. Congress candidates for Vermont at Project Vote Smart
 Vermont U.S. Senate from OurCampaigns.com
 Campaign contributions from Open Secrets
 2010 Vermont Senate General Election: Len Britton (R) vs Patrick Leahy (D) graph of multiple polls from Pollster.com
 Election 2010: Vermont Senate from Rasmussen Reports
 2010 Vermont Senate Race from Real Clear Politics
 2010 Vermont Senate Race from CQ Politics
 Race profile from The New York Times
Official campaign websites
 Pat Leahy for U.S. Senate incumbent
 Len Britton for U.S. Senate

2010 Vermont elections
Vermont
2010